Javelle Glen (born 26 February 1998) is a Jamaican cricketer. He made his Twenty20 debut on 13 September 2019, for the Jamaica Tallawahs, in the 2019 Caribbean Premier League. In July 2020, he was named in the St Lucia Zouks squad for the 2020 Caribbean Premier League. He made his List A debut on 16 February 2021, for Jamaica, in the 2020–21 Super50 Cup.

References

External links
 

1998 births
Living people
Jamaican cricketers
Jamaica cricketers
Jamaica Tallawahs cricketers
Place of birth missing (living people)